Trust Me, I'm Dr. Ozzy: Advice from Rock's Ultimate Survivor (shortened to Trust Me, I'm Dr. Ozzy) is a book by Ozzy Osbourne, vocalist of Black Sabbath and solo singer. It is the sequel to his 2010 release I Am Ozzy. The book chronicles his drug abuse and survival stories about 40 years of Ozzy's drug and alcohol abuse. It also features Osbourne's health advice. The book was co-written by Chris Ayres, because of Osbourne's dyslexia.

Reception
The book holds a 3.75 rating out of 5 on goodreads.com.

References

British autobiographies
Black Sabbath
2011 non-fiction books
Heavy metal publications
Music autobiographies
Ozzy Osbourne
Grand Central Publishing books